Pronto Software is an Australian Enterprise Resource Planning software vendor. Originally trading under the name “Prometheus Software”, the company was sold to Sausage Software in 1999. The name was then changed to 'Pronto Software' following a management buyout in 2002.

Pronto Xi is Pronto Software's main product. It has modules for financials, retail, CRM, supply chain management, warehouse management, manufacturing and facilities management. Pronto Software has around 1500 customers, and Pronto Xi 770 is the current product release.

History
1976  Pronto founded as Prometheus Software Development in Sydney, Australia 
1984  Launches suite of PRONTO Enterprise Management tools. Expands operations in Melbourne and Brisbane
1987  Installed first site
1999  Acquisition by Sausage Software 
2002  Establishes Pronto Software after a management buyout 
2005  Launches PRONTO-Xi Phase 4
2006  Pronto Software named The Age/D&B Victorian Business of the Year. Launches PRONTO-Xi Phase 5
2007  Awarded IBM’s Reseller of the Year
2008  Won the D&B/The Age Business Awards (IT) and AIIA iAwards for Alert Intelligence
2009  Won the Australian Business Awards for Enterprise. Surpassed $50 million in turn over.  Launches PRONTO-Xi Phase 6.
2011  Won the 2011 IBM Choice Award for Midmarket Leadership. Launches Pronto Xi Dimensions.
2015  Awarded 2015 ABA100 Winner in The Australian Business Awards for Best Software Product.
2016  ABA100 Winner for Cloud Innovation in The Australian Business Awards.
2016  Pronto launches digital consultancy

Technology

Pronto Xi runs on Linux (RedHat), UNIX (AIX or Solaris), or Microsoft Windows Server 2008.  In Unix/Linux deployments, users access the application through a proprietary thin client application which connects to the server using SSH, Telnet, or SSL encrypted Telnet. Recent years have seen the introduction of a web client that is the basis of future development.

Supported databases are Informix Dynamic Server, Oracle, or SQL Server.

Technology partners
Pronto Software is partnered with IBM, Remap, TIG Freight Management, ProSpend, Action HRM, Nomos One, Maralan Documentation, QBuild, Square, BundyPlus, Filebound Solutions, Ozedi and Finlease.

References 

Australian brands
ERP software companies
Software companies of Australia